Prince Johann Georg Pius Karl Leopold Maria Januarius Anacletus of Saxony, Duke of Saxony (10 July 1869 – 24 November 1938) was the sixth child and second-eldest son of George of Saxony and his wife Infanta Maria Ana of Portugal and a younger brother of the Kingdom of Saxony's last king, Frederick Augustus III of Saxony. Johann Georg was a well-known arts expert and an avid art collector.

Early life
Johann Georg was the sixth of eight children and the second son of George of Saxony, the penultimate king of Saxony, and his wife Infanta Maria Ana of Portugal. The prince was raised in Dresden and received a strict Roman Catholic upbringing.

Johann Georg's early education was conducted by private teachers until 1881 when he began his military training. From 1889 through 1890, Johann Georg and his younger brother Maximilian studied law together in Freiburg im Breisgau. After switching to the University of Leipzig, Johann Georg mainly attended lectures on history and art history. In 1909, the prince received an honorary doctorate from the University of Leipzig.

Royal career
In October 1902 he was sent on a mission to the various courts of Europe to announce the accession of his father King Georg to the throne four months earlier. He was received by King Edward VII in London on 12 October, and also visited Windsor Castle.

Marriage

Johann Georg married first to Duchess Maria Isabella of Württemberg, third child and second-eldest daughter of Duke Philipp of Württemberg and his wife Archduchess Maria Theresa of Austria, on 5 April 1894 in Stuttgart, Württemberg; they did not have children. Maria Isabella died on 24 May 1904 at age 32 in Dresden.

He married for a second time to Princess Maria Immacolata of Bourbon-Two Sicilies, fourth child and eldest daughter of Prince Alfonso of Bourbon-Two Sicilies, Count of Caserta and his wife Princess Antonietta of Bourbon-Two Sicilies, on 30 October 1906 in Cannes, France. The couple did not have children.

Residences

From 1902, Johann Georg resided at Schloss Weesenstein approximately 30 km from Dresden, high above Müglitztal. In 1918, after the end of World War I and the abdication of his brother Frederick Augustus III, Johann Georg sold Schloss Weesenstein and moved his permanent residence to Freiburg im Breisgau.

Honours
 : Knight of the Order of the Rue Crown, 1881
 :
 Grand Cross of the Order of St. Stephen, 1891
 Knight of the Order of the Golden Fleece, 1898
 : Knight of the House Order of Fidelity, 1905
 : Knight of the Order of St. Hubert, 1898
 : Grand Cross of the Ludwig Order, 6 April 1892
 : Knight of the Order of the Black Eagle
 : Grand Cross of the Order of the White Falcon, 1890
 : Grand Cross of the Order of the Württemberg Crown, 1892
 : Grand Cross of the Order of Charles III, with Collar, 20 October 1908

Ancestry

References

External links
 

1869 births
1938 deaths
House of Wettin
Albertine branch
Saxon princes
Nobility from Dresden
German Roman Catholics
Members of the First Chamber of the Diet of the Kingdom of Saxony
Knights of the Golden Fleece of Austria
Grand Crosses of the Order of Saint Stephen of Hungary
Sons of kings